Jorge de Lencastre, or George of Lencastre (Azeitão, 1594 – Lisbon, 1632) was the older son of Dom Álvaro and Juliana of Lencastre, 3rd Dukes of Aveiro.

As heir of the Dukes of Aveiro, he was 3rd Marquis of Torres Novas and, due to King Philip I's special grant, he also became the 1st Duke of Torres Novas.

However, he never inherited the Dukedom of Aveiro, once he died before his mother.

He married twice:
in 1619, with Ana Dória Colonna (who died in 1620, daughter of André Dória, 3rd Prince of Melfi. They had no issue.
the 2nd marriage with Ana Manrique de Cádenas (who died in Madrid in 1660) daughter of the Spanish 3rd Dukes of Maqueda. They had four children:
Raimundo of Lencastre, 4th Duke of Aveiro;
Maria de Guadalupe of Lencastre, 6th Duchess of Aveiro;
Luisa Tomásia Manrique de Lancastre (1632 – ? ), without issue;
João Matias Manrique de Lancastre Cardenas (1633–1659), without issue.

See also
Infante George of Lencastre
Duke of Aveiro
Duke of Torres Novas
Marquis of Torres Novas

External links
 Genealogy of George of Lencastre, 1st Duke of Torres Novas, in Portuguese

Bibliography
 ”Nobreza de Portugal e do Brasil" – Vol. III, page 446. Published by Zairol Lda., Lisbon 1989.

Torres Novas
101
1594 births
1632 deaths